Éric Boucher (born December 1, 1958 in Le Bouscat, France) is a former professional footballer.

Career
After beginning his career with French Division 2 side Lyon, Boucher joined Niort. He helped the club gain promotion to the French Division 1, and he scored his first top-flight goal in the 1987–88 season against AS Saint-Étienne.

After he retired from playing football, Boucher was the mayor of Fraisnes-en-Saintois.

References

External links
Eric Boucher profile at chamoisfc79.fr

1958 births
Living people
French footballers
Association football defenders
FC Girondins de Bordeaux players
Olympique Lyonnais players
Chamois Niortais F.C. players
Ligue 1 players
Ligue 2 players